The List of World Heritage in Danger is compiled by the United Nations Educational, Scientific and Cultural Organization (UNESCO) through the World Heritage Committee according to Article 11.4 of the World Heritage Convention, which was established in 1972 to designate and manage World Heritage Sites. Entries in the list are threatened World Heritage Sites for the conservation of which major operations are required and for which "assistance has been requested". The list is intended to increase international awareness of the threats and to encourage counteractive measures. Threats to a site can be either proven imminent threats or potential dangers that could have adverse effects on a site.

In the case of natural sites, ascertained dangers include the serious decline in the population of an endangered or other valuable species or the deterioration of natural beauty or scientific value of a property caused by human activities such as logging, pollution, settlement, mining, agriculture and major public works. Ascertained dangers for cultural properties include serious deterioration of materials, structure, ornaments or architectural coherence and the loss of historical authenticity or cultural significance. Potential dangers for both cultural and natural sites include development projects, armed conflicts, insufficient management systems or changes in the legal protective status of the properties. In the case of cultural sites, gradual changes due to geology, climate or environment can also be potential dangers.

Before a property is inscribed on the List of World Heritage in Danger, its condition is assessed and a potential programme for corrective measures is developed in cooperation with the State Party involved. The final decision about inscription is made by the committee. Financial support from the World Heritage Fund may be allocated by the committee for listed properties. The state of conservation is reviewed on a yearly basis, after which the committee may request additional measures, delete the property from the list if the threats have ceased or consider deletion from both the List of World Heritage in Danger and the World Heritage List. Of the three former UNESCO World Heritage Sites, the Dresden Elbe Valley and the Liverpool Maritime Mercantile City were delisted after placement on the List of World Heritage in Danger while the Arabian Oryx Sanctuary was directly delisted.  Some sites have been designated as World Heritage Sites and World Heritage in Danger in the same year, such as the Church of the Nativity, traditionally considered to be the birthplace of Jesus.

In some cases, danger listing has sparked conservation efforts and prompted the release of funds, resulting in a positive development for sites such as the Galápagos Islands and Yellowstone National Park, both of which have subsequently been removed from the List of World Heritage in Danger. Despite this, the list itself and UNESCO's implementation of it have been the focus of criticism. In particular, States Parties and other stakeholders of World Heritage Sites have questioned the authority of the Committee to declare a site in danger without their consent. Until 1992, when UNESCO set a precedent by placing several sites on the danger list against their wishes, States Parties would have submitted a programme of corrective measures before a site could be listed. Instead of being used as intended, the List of World Heritage in Danger is perceived by some states as a black list and according to Christina Cameron, Professor at the School of Architecture, Canada Research Chair on Built Heritage, University of Montreal, has been used as political tool to get the attention of States Parties. The International Union for Conservation of Nature (IUCN) notes that UNESCO has referenced the List of World Heritage in Danger (without actually listing the site) in a number of cases where the threat could be easily addressed by the State Party. The Union also argues that keeping a site listed as endangered over a long period is questionable and that other mechanisms for conservation should be sought in these cases.

, there are 53 entries (17 natural, 36 cultural) on the List of World Heritage in Danger. Arranged by the UNESCO regions, 21 of the listed sites are located in the Arab States (of which 6 are located in Syria and 5 in Libya), 16 in Africa (of which 5 are in the Democratic Republic of the Congo), 6 in Latin America and the Caribbean, 6 in Asia and the Pacific, and 4 in Europe and North America. The majority of the endangered natural sites (12) are located in Africa.

Currently listed sites

Table legend

Name: as listed by the World Heritage Committee
Location: at city or provincial level and country name, with coordinates; column sorts by state
Criteria: the site was listed under
Area: in hectares and acres if provided by UNESCO
Year (WHS): the year the site was inscribed on the World Heritage List
Endangered: the year the site appeared on the List of World Heritage in Danger
Reason: threats to the site which prompted UNESCO to list it as in danger

Previously listed sites

There are a number of sites that were previously listed as being in danger, but they were later removed from the list after improvements in management and conservation. The Everglades National Park was listed from 1993 to 2007 and again since 2010; the Río Plátano Biosphere Reserve was listed from 1996 to 2007 and again since 2011. Both are therefore included in the list of currently listed sites (above).

See also

Notes

References 
 Citations

 General

External links
 UNESCO World Heritage Sites, official site
 UNESCO World Heritage Centre – World Heritage in Danger List, official site
 UNESCO Heritage Centre – World Heritage List, official site